Walim may refer to the following places in Poland:
Walim, Lower Silesian Voivodeship (south-west Poland)
Walim, Masovian Voivodeship (east-central Poland)